Louis Isias Strydom (born 21 October 1980) is a South African rugby union player, currently playing with the .

He was born in Welkom and started playing for the local  team.

He was a key member of their 2014 Currie Cup First Division-winning side. He played in the final, kicking ten points to help the Griffons win the match 23–21 to win their first trophy for six years.

References

1980 births
Living people
Blue Bulls players
Cheetahs (rugby union) players
Eastern Province Elephants players
Falcons (rugby union) players
Free State Cheetahs players
Golden Lions players
Griffons (rugby union) players
Lions (United Rugby Championship) players
Rugby union players from Welkom
South African rugby union players
Rugby union fly-halves